The Jamestown and Franklin Railroad (J&F) was a shortline railroad which operated in the U.S. states of Ohio and Pennsylvania. Established in 1862, its main line ran from Jamestown, Pennsylvania, to Oil City, Pennsylvania. A branch line connected Jamestown with Ashtabula, Ohio. The railroad leased itself to the Lake Shore and Michigan Southern Railway in 1864 for 20 years. A 1909 consolidation with three other railroads created the Jamestown, Franklin and Clearfield Railroad, and ended the J&F's existence.

Founding and charter
In 1862, George A. Bittenbender, William Gibson, David Hadley, Henry C. Hickok, A. W. Raymond, William Lawrence Scott, and John P. Vincent—all northwestern Pennsylvania businessmen—sought a charter for a shortline railroad in northwestern Pennsylvania. The Jamestown and Franklin Railroad (J&F) was chartered under an act passed by the Pennsylvania General Assembly on April 5, 1862. The company had the right to build branches to connect its road to any other railroad nearby, and to purchase any unfinished railroad in either county and complete it. These purchases could include mineral rights, and the railroad was permitted to open mines or drill for oil. Additionally, the firm's branch lines were limited to just  each.

On April 19, 1864, the charter was amended by the legislature a third time, to permit construction of either a narrow-gauge or standard-gauge branch south of Oil City into Cranberry Township in Venango County.

Construction of the line

The railroad was headquartered in Sheakleyville, a small town located about midpoint on the road's main line.

Construction began in Jamestown in 1864. By this time, major investors in the railroad also included George Palmer, president of the Buffalo and State Line Railroad, and Amasa Stone, a director of the Cleveland, Painesville and Ashtabula Railroad (CP&A). William Gibson, the J&F's president, gave to the J&F (in exchange for more of the railroad's stock) the right of way and finished track of the bankrupt Pittsburgh and Erie Railroad between Jamestown and the village of Sugar Creek.

On March 21, 1864, the CP&A leased the entirety of the J&F for 20 years. The cost of the lease was 40 percent of the J&F's annual earnings. The CP&A now began loaning the J&F extensive funds, allowing the smaller railroad to rapidly expand. By August 1865, the J&F had taken possession of or laid  of track and reached the village of Stoneboro, Pennsylvania, location of the Mercer Iron and Coal Company coal mines. (These mines were leased and operated by Stone's CP&A.)

By the summer of 1867, the track had gone another mile east and reached Franklin, Pennsylvania, just to the west of Oil City. Trains began running into Franklin on June 27, three days after completion of the road.

In 1869, work began on the road between Franklin and Oil City. The J&F contracted with an excavating company to make hillside cuts and grade the line. But this firm's work proved unsatisfactory, and it was fired. A second company was hired. Their work was much improved, and the line went forward. To reach its destination, however, the railroad had to bridge French Creek, which it finally did in January 1870. The road was completed in 1870, and the first train ran to Oil City on May 24, 1870.

In the spring of 1869, the CP&A consolidated with the Cleveland and Toledo Railroad and the Michigan Southern and Northern Indiana Railroad to create the Lake Shore and Michigan Southern Railway (LS&MS).

Construction now began on a branch line between Jamestown and Ashtabula, Ohio, to connect the J&F with the LS&MS. Sources differ as to which company conducted this work. Historian Charles A. Babcock says in passing that it was the J&F, but historian Thomas W. Sanderson provides extensive evidence that it was the CP&A. Sanderson notes that CP&A stockholders approved the branch in 1863, and work was begun in 1864. After a great deal of the line was built, it was abandoned for reasons which remain unclear. Work began again in 1871, and the branch was completed in August 1872. Completion of the line markedly reduced traffic from Jamestown to Girard. Most of this traffic was headed west, and now traveled over the Ashtabula Branch to reach the LS&MS.

The railroad's total length was now .

Ownership changes

On January 26, 1909, the J&F, the Central Trunk Railroad, the Franklin and Clearfield Railroad, and the Jackson Coal Railroad consolidated to create the Jamestown, Franklin and Clearfield Railroad. When the consolidation was complete, the LS&MS purchased 2,535 shares of stock of the company in exchange for forgiving a portion of the debt it had incurred in building the lines of these roads.

The New York Central and Hudson River Railroad acquired a controlling majority in the LS&MS in 1877. In 1914, an asset restructuring and refinancing of the New York Central led to the abolishment of all subsidiary corporations and their consolidation into a new New York Central Railroad. On April 7, 1915, the New York Central (NYC) purchased the Jamestown, Franklin and Clearfield Railroad in a debt-for-ownership exchange. The NYC then abolished the separate corporate existence of the Jamestown, Franklin and Clearfield Railroad.

References
Notes

Citations

Bibliography

Lake Shore and Michigan Southern Railway lines
New York Central Railroad lines
Rail infrastructure in Ohio
Rail infrastructure in Pennsylvania
Railway lines opened in 1862
Railway lines closed in 1909
Defunct Pennsylvania railroads
Defunct Ohio railroads
Closed railway lines in the United States